Quellón is a Chilean port city and commune in Chiloé Province, in southern Chiloé Island, Los Lagos Region. It is considered the southern end-station of the Panamerican Highway and the Pacific Coast Highway. The city is a hub for aquaculture and fisheries in southern Chiloé and the Guaitecas and Chonos archipelagoes to the south. Various ferry lanes connects Quellón with the Patagonian settlements such as Melinka, Puerto Cisnes and Puerto Chacabuco.

In Quellón the majority of men work on small boats called "lanchas" for days at a time fishing. Also many men and women work in local seafood processing plants.

Climate
Quellón has an oceanic climate (Köppen climate classification Cfb) with some drying trend in summer. Few days are dry in winter, since there are 22–24 days with measurable precipitation from June to August. Nonetheless, snowfall is rare and most years will record no snowfall. Temperatures can occasionally exceed  anytime from September to June. One characteristic of the climate is that Quellón, like the rest of the central and southern parts of Chiloé island is exposed to strong westerly winds throughout the year. On average, there are 239 days with measureable precipitation.

Demographics
Of these, 13,656 (62.6%) lived in urban areas and 8,167 (37.4%) in rural areas. The population grew by 45% (6,768 persons) between the 1992 and 2002 censuses.

Administration
As a commune, Quellón is a third-level administrative division of Chile administered by a municipal council, headed by an alcalde who is directly elected every four years. The 2008-2012 alcalde is Iván Haro Uribe (RN). 

Within the electoral divisions of Chile, Quellón is represented in the Chamber of Deputies by Gabriel Ascencio (PDC) and Alejandro Santana (RN) as part of the 58th electoral district, together with Castro, Ancud, Quemchi, Dalcahue, Curaco de Vélez, Quinchao, Puqueldón, Chonchi, Queilén, Chaitén, Hualaihué, Futaleufú and Palena. The commune is represented in the Senate by Camilo Escalona Medina (PS) and Carlos Kuschel Silva (RN) as part of the 17th senatorial constituency (Los Lagos Region).

Transport

A placard in Quellón marks a southern terminus of the Pan-American Highway, a network of roads spanning  and 19 countries in the Americas. Its northern limit  is in Anchorage, Alaska. Tierra del Fuego National Park in Argentina is also considered as an endpoint for the Panamerican Highway. The point also marks the southern endpoint of the Pacific Coastal Highway, which stretches  from Lund, British Columbia. The southernmost reaches of continental Chile are not accessible by road except through neighboring Argentina due to the craggy Andes, fjords  and the Southern Patagonian Ice Field.
 
Mocopulli Airport is in Chiloe Island; it offers flights to Santiago via LAN Express airlines.

Sights 
There are two museums in Quellón: The museum Museo Inchin Cuivi Anti (the name means "Our ancestors") explains the culture and the history of the Huilliche, and the Municipal Museum (Museo Municipal) refers to the history of the town. The Cultural Center of Quellón was built with the financial help of the salmon processing industry.

The market Feria Artesanal Llauquil and the marine drive Costanera P. Montt offering a scenic view of the beautiful surroundings are worth a visit as well.

Close to Quellón there are several interesting villages, e.g. Punta de Lapa (5 km) with a beautiful 5 km long beach, or Compu (about 25 km to the north) with a wooden church which was built at the beginning of the 20th century. Quellón Viejo (4 km to the southwest), a village with an interesting cemetery and a typical wooden church dating from the beginning of the 20th century is older than Quellón. Yaldad (11 km to the west) is a Huilliche village with about 500 inhabitants (2002) and a wooden church (Iglesia Jesús de Nazareno) representing the typical style of Chiloé which was built at the beginning of the 20th century and renovated in 1990. Trincao (10 km to the southwest) has a sightworthy cemetery and an interesting church dating from 1920.

References

External links 

 Website Quellón

Communes of Chile
Port cities in Chile
Populated places established in 1905
Populated places in Chiloé
Populated places in Chiloé Province
1905 establishments in Chile